Sonja Sperl (3 December 1936 – 13 August 2020) was a German alpine skier who competed in the 1956 Winter Olympics and in the 1960 Winter Olympics.

References

1936 births
2020 deaths
German female alpine skiers
Olympic alpine skiers of the United Team of Germany
Alpine skiers at the 1956 Winter Olympics
Alpine skiers at the 1960 Winter Olympics
People from Regen (district)
Sportspeople from Lower Bavaria